Gurmeet Saajan (Punjabi: ਗੁਰਮੀਤ ਸਾਜਨ) is an Indian film and television actor who works in Indian cinema. He started his career as a singer, did few Punjabi short movies and television soap operas in the earlier days and ended up appearing in the films. He is most remembered for his role as Fuffad in 2015 Punjabi movie Angrej.

Filmography

Telefilms 
 Ghala Mala (2006)
 Ghala Mala 2 (2008) 
 Maa Da Dharminder
 Taragi Wala Baba
 Amli Punjab De (2016)
 Ullu De Pathe
 Hun Kar Gall (Ghala Mala 5)
 Adhoora Sawaal (2017)

Television serials
 Do Akal Garh
 Kissa Puran Bhagat
 Apni Mitti
 Professor Moneyplant

Music albums
 Nachna Vi Manjoor
 Oh Din Parat Nahi Aune

References

External links
 

Living people
1961 births